Julio César Etchegoyen (1926 – March 23, 2017) was an Argentine military officer and politician. He was the de facto military Governor of Chubut Province from 1976 to 1978 and Governor of La Pampa Province from 1978 until 1981 during the  National Reorganization Process dictatorship.

Etchegoyen died on March 23, 2017, at the age of 83.

References

1926 births
2017 deaths
Argentine Army officers
Governors of Chubut Province
Governors of La Pampa Province